This is a partial list of recordings of songs on which the Wrecking Crew session drummer Hal Blaine played.

A

 "All I Have to Do Is Dream" (Bobbie Gentry and Glen Campbell)
 "All I Know" (Art Garfunkel)
 "All I Wanna Do" (The Beach Boys)
 "Along Comes Mary" (The Association)
 "America" (Simon & Garfunkel)
 "Andmoreagain" (Love)
 "Annie's Song" (John Denver)
 "Another Saturday Night" (Sam Cooke)
 "Any World (That I'm Welcome To)" (Steely Dan)
 "Aquarius/Let the Sunshine In" (The 5th Dimension)
 "At the Zoo" (Simon & Garfunkel)

B

 "Baby I Need Your Loving" (Johnny Rivers)
 "Baby Talk" (Jan and Dean)
 "Back Home Again" (John Denver)
 "Barbara Ann" (The Beach Boys)
 "Batman Theme" (The Marketts) 
 "Be My Baby" (The Ronettes)
 "Be True to Your School" (The Beach Boys)
 "(The Best Part of) Breakin' Up" (The Ronettes)
 "Bless the Beasts and the Children" (The Carpenters)
 "Bossa Nova Baby" (Elvis Presley)
 "The Boxer" (Simon & Garfunkel)
 "Bridge over Troubled Water" (Simon & Garfunkel)
 "By the Time I Get to Phoenix" (Tony Mann)
 "By the Time I Get to Phoenix" (Johnny Rivers)
 "By the Time I Get to Phoenix" (Glen Campbell)

C

 "California Dreamin'" (The Mamas and the Papas)
 "California Girls" (The Beach Boys)
 "Calypso" (John Denver)
 "Can't Help Falling in Love" (Elvis Presley)
 "Can't You Hear the Song?" (Wayne Newton)
 "Cara Mia" (Jay and the Americans)
 "Caroline, No" (Brian Wilson)
 "Cecilia" (Simon & Garfunkel)
 "Cherish" (David Cassidy)
 "Christmas (Baby Please Come Home)" (Darlene Love)
 "Come a Little Bit Closer" (Jay and the Americans)
 "Come and Knock on Our Door" (theme from the television series Three's Company)
 "Come Back When You Grow Up" (Bobby Vee)
 "Come Saturday Morning" (The Sandpipers)
 Congratulations (Paul Simon), track 11 on 1972 album Paul Simon
 "Cotton Fields" (The Beach Boys)
 "Count Me In" (Gary Lewis & the Playboys)
 "Could It Be Forever" (David Cassidy)
 "Cracklin' Rosie" (Neil Diamond)
 "Creeque Alley" (The Mamas and the Papas)

D

 "Da Doo Ron Ron" (The Crystals)
 "Daddy Don't You Walk So Fast" (Wayne Newton)
 "The Daily Planet" (Love)
 "Dance, Dance, Dance" (The Beach Boys)
 "Darlin'" (The Beach Boys)
 "Dead Man's Curve" (Jan and Dean)
 "Death of a Ladies' Man" (Leonard Cohen)
 "Dedicated to the One I Love" (The Mamas and the Papas)
 "Didn't We" (Richard Harris)
 "Dizzy" (Tommy Roe)
 "Do You Know Where You're Going To" (theme from the film Mahogany) (Diana Ross)
 "Doesn't Somebody Want to Be Wanted" (The Partridge Family)
 "Don't Pull Your Love" (Hamilton, Joe Frank & Reynolds)
 "The Door Is Still Open to My Heart" (Dean Martin)
 "Drag City" (Jan and Dean)
 "Dream a Little Dream of Me" (The Mamas and the Papas)

E

 "18 Yellow Roses" (Bobby Darin)
 "El Condor Pasa" (Simon & Garfunkel)
 "Elusive Butterfly" (Bob Lind)
 "Evangeline" (Emmylou Harris)
 "Eve of Destruction" (Barry McGuire)
 "Everybody Loves a Clown" (Gary Lewis & the Playboys)
 "Everybody Loves Somebody" (Dean Martin)
 "Everything That Touches You" (The Association)

F

 "Fakin' It" (Simon & Garfunkel)
 "For All We Know" (The Carpenters)
 "Fun, Fun, Fun" (The Beach Boys)

G

 "Galveston" (Glen Campbell)
 "Go Where You Wanna Go" (The Mamas and the Papas)
 "Go Where You Wanna Go" (The Fifth Dimension)
 "God Only Knows" (The Beach Boys)
 "Good Vibrations" (The Beach Boys)
 "Goodbye to Love" (The Carpenters)
 "Guantanamera" (The Sandpipers)
 "Guess I'm Dumb" (Glen Campbell)

H

 "Half-Breed" (Cher)
 "The Happening" (The Supremes)
 "A Hazy Shade of Winter" (Simon & Garfunkel)
 "He's a Rebel" (The Crystals) 
 "Help Me, Rhonda" (The Beach Boys)
 "Hey Little Cobra" (The Rip Chords)
 "Hey Jude" (Bing Crosby)
 "Him or Me – What's It Gonna Be?" (Paul Revere & the Raiders)
 "Hold Me, Thrill Me, Kiss Me" (Mel Carter)
 "Holly Holy" (Neil Diamond)
 "Homeward Bound" (Simon & Garfunkel)
 "Houston" (Dean Martin)
 "How Does That Grab You?" (Nancy Sinatra)
 "Hungry" (Paul Revere & the Raiders)
 "Hurting Each Other" (The Carpenters)

I

 "I Am... I Said" (Neil Diamond)
 "I Believe You" (The Carpenters)
 I Can't Go On (Chris and Craig)
 "I Couldn't Live Without Your Love" (Petula Clark)
 "I Get Around" (The Beach Boys)
 "I Got You Babe" (Sonny & Cher)
 "I Need You" (America)
 I Need You (Chris and Craig)
 "I Saw Her Again" (The Mamas and the Papas)
 "I Think I Love You" (The Partridge Family)
 "If I Can Dream" (Elvis Presley) 
 "If I Were a Carpenter" (Bobby Darin)
 "I'll Meet You Halfway" (The Partridge Family)
 "I'm Sorry" (John Denver)
 "In My Room" (The Beach Boys)
 "Indian Reservation (The Lament of the Cherokee Reservation Indian)" (Paul Revere & the Raiders)
 "It Never Rains in Southern California" (Albert Hammond)
 "It's Getting Better" (Cass Elliot)
 "It's Over" (Roy Orbison)
 "I Won't Last a Day Without You" (The Carpenters)

J
 "Jam Up and Jelly Tight" (Tommy Roe)
 "Jambalaya (On the Bayou)" (The Carpenters)
 "Johnny Angel" (Shelley Fabares)
 "José Cuervo" (Shelly West)
 "Just Dropped In (To See What Condition My Condition Was In)" (The First Edition)

K

 "Kicks" (Paul Revere & the Raiders)

L
 "(Last Night) I Didn't Get to Sleep at All" (The 5th Dimension)
 "Leave Me Alone (Ruby Red Dress)" (Helen Reddy)
 "Let Him Run Wild" (The Beach Boys)
 "Let's Live for Today" (The Grass Roots)
 "Like a Sad Song" (John Denver)
 "Like to Get to Know You" (Spanky and Our Gang)
 "A Little Bit Me, a Little Bit You" (The Monkees)
 "Little Deuce Coupe" (The Beach Boys)
 "The Little Girl I Once Knew" (The Beach Boys)
 "A Little Less Conversation" (Elvis Presley)
 "The Little Old Lady (from Pasadena)" (Jan and Dean)
 "Lizzie and the Rainman" (Tanya Tucker)
 "The Lonely Bull" (Herb Alpert and the Tijuana Brass)
 "Looking Through the Eyes of Love" (The Partridge Family)
 "Love Theme from Romeo and Juliet" (Henry Mancini)
 "Love Will Keep Us Together" (Captain & Tennille)

M

 "MacArthur Park" (Richard Harris)
 "Make Your Own Kind of Music" (Cass Elliot)
 "Mamma" (Connie Francis)
 "Mary, Mary" (The Monkees)
 "Midnight Confessions" (The Grass Roots)
 "Mona Lisa" (Nat King Cole) (remaster)
 "Monday, Monday" (The Mamas and the Papas)
 "Mother and Child Reunion" (Paul Simon)
 "Mountain of Love" (Johnny Rivers)
 "Mr. Tambourine Man"  (The Byrds)
 "Mrs. Robinson" (Simon & Garfunkel)
 "Muskrat Love" (Captain & Tennille)
 "My Love" (Petula Clark)
 "My Special Angel" (The Vogues)

N

 "Never My Love" (The Association)
 "New Shabbos Waltz" (David Grisman and Andy Statman)
 "The Night Has a Thousand Eyes" (Bobby Vee)
 "No Matter What Shape (Your Stomach's In)" (The T-Bones)

O
 "(Oly Oxen Free Free Free) Hide Go Seek" (The Honeys)
 "One Less Bell to Answer" (The 5th Dimension)
 "The Only Living Boy in New York" (Simon & Garfunkel)
 "Our Sweet Love" (The Beach Boys)
 "Out of Limits" (The Marketts)

P

 "Paranoia Blues" (Paul Simon), track 10 on 1972 album Paul Simon
 "Poor Side of Town" (Johnny Rivers)

R

 "Rainy Days and Mondays" (The Carpenters)
 "Red Roses for a Blue Lady" (Vic Dana)
 "Return to Sender" (Elvis Presley)
 "Rhythm of the Rain" (The Cascades)
 "Ringo" (Lorne Greene)
 "Rock-A-Hula Baby" (Elvis Presley)
 "The Rocky Horror Show" (original Roxy Theatre cast recording)
 "Run That Body Down" (Paul Simon), track 4 on 1972 album Paul Simon

S

 "San Francisco (Be Sure to Wear Flowers in Your Hair)" (Scott McKenzie)
 "Save Your Heart for Me" (Gary Lewis & the Playboys)
 "She's a Fool" (Lesley Gore)
 "She's Just My Style" (Gary Lewis & the Playboys)
 "The Seventh Son" (Johnny Rivers)
 "Sleigh Ride" (The Ronettes)
 "Sloop John B" (The Beach Boys)
 "The Snake" (Al Wilson)
 "So Long, Frank Lloyd Wright" (Simon & Garfunkel)
 "Softly, as I Leave You" (Frank Sinatra)
 "Somethin' Stupid" (Frank and Nancy Sinatra)
 "Song Sung Blue" (Neil Diamond)
 "Sooner or Later" (The Grass Roots)
 "Stoned Soul Picnic" (The 5th Dimension)
 "Stoney End" (Barbra Streisand)
 "Strangers in the Night" (Frank Sinatra)
 "Sugar Town" (Nancy Sinatra)
 "Sunshower" (Thelma Houston, prod: Jimmy Webb)
 "Superstar" (The Carpenters)
 "Sure Gonna Miss Her" (Gary Lewis & the Playboys)
 "Surf City" (Jan and Dean)
 "Surfer Girl" (The Beach Boys)

T

 "A Taste of Honey" (Herb Alpert)
 "Tears in the Morning" (The Beach Boys)
 "A Texas State of Mind" (David Frizzell and Shelly West)
 "Thank God I'm a Country Boy" (John Denver)
 "That's Life" (Frank Sinatra)
 "Then He Kissed Me" (The Crystals)
 "(They Long to Be) Close to You" (The Carpenters)
 "This Diamond Ring" (Gary Lewis & the Playboys)
 "This Girl Is a Woman Now" (Gary Puckett & the Union Gap)
 "This Is My Song" (Petula Clark)
 "Top of the World" (The Carpenters)
 "The Tracks of My Tears" (Johnny Rivers)
 "Turn Around, Look at Me" (The Vogues)

U

 "Up, Up and Away" (The 5th Dimension)

V

 "Ventura Highway" (America)

W

 "Wedding Bell Blues" (The 5th Dimension)
 "(Where Do I Begin?) Love Story" (Andy Williams)
 "Where the Boys Are" (Connie Francis)
 "We've Only Just Begun" (The Carpenters)
 "Windy" (The Association)
 "Woman, Woman" (Gary Puckett & The Union Gap)
 "Words of Love" (The Mamas and the Papas)
 "Workin' On a Groovy Thing" (The 5th Dimension)
 "Wouldn't It Be Nice" (The Beach Boys)

Y

 "The Yard Went on Forever" (Richard Harris)
 "Yesterday Once More" (The Carpenters)
 "Young Girl" (Gary Puckett & The Union Gap)
 "(You're the) Devil in Disguise" (Elvis Presley)
 "You're the One" (The Vogues)
 "You're the Reason God Made Oklahoma" (David Frizzell and Shelly West)
 "You've Never Done It Like That" (Captain & Tennille)

Z
 "Zip-a-Dee-Doo-Dah" (Bob B. Soxx & the Blue Jeans)

Notes

All of the dates shown are the following year of the award. The Grammy year preceded the television broadcast by several months.

References

Sources

  
 

Lists of songs by session musician